Saad Mubarak Ali (born 18 September 1960) is a Bahraini long-distance runner. He competed in the men's marathon at the 1992 Summer Olympics.

References

External links

1960 births
Living people
Athletes (track and field) at the 1992 Summer Olympics
Bahraini male long-distance runners
Bahraini male marathon runners
Olympic athletes of Bahrain
Place of birth missing (living people)